Printer may refer to:

Technology
 Printer (publishing), a person or a company
 Printer (computing), a hardware device
 Optical printer for motion picture films

People
 Nariman Printer (fl. c. 1940), Indian journalist and activist
 James Printer (1640–1709), Native American from the Nipmuc tribe who worked as a printer in Cambridge, Massachusetts, U.S.
 Casey Printers (born 1981), U.S. football player

Places
 Printer, Kentucky, an unincorporated community and coal town in Floyd County, Kentucky, U.S.
 Printer's Alley, an alley in downtown Nashville, Tennessee, U.S., that was historically home to multiple publishers
 Printer's Park, a small park in the Bronx, New York City, U.S.

See also
 The Moscow subway station Pechatniki, whose name means "Printers"